The Barbados national netball team represent Barbados in international netball. The Barbadian team qualified for the 2011 World Netball Championships in Singapore, finishing 11th. The Bajan Gems are coached by Anna Shepherd, and are captained by Rhe-Ann Niles. As of 1 July 2020, Barbados is 13th in the INF World Rankings.

Players

2019 Bajan Gems Netball World Cup Team

Competitive history

References

National netball teams of the Americas
Netball in Barbados
Netball